Anthony (Antonio) de Francisci (July 13, 1887 – August 20, 1964) was an Italian-American sculptor who designed a number of United States coins and medals. His most famous design was the Peace Dollar, which was first minted in 1921.

Early life and training
De Francisci immigrated to the United States in 1905 and became a naturalized citizen of the United States in 1913. He was the son of Benedetto de Francisci and Maria Liberante and was married to Mary Teresa Cafarelli. De Francisci "studied under some very fine coin designers: Fraser, MacNeil, and Weinman."

Career
De Francisci served as an Academician of the National Academy of Design and a Fellow of the National Sculpture Society.

Works

Peace Dollar

Late in 1921, the Commission of Fine Arts held a competition for the design of a new silver dollar and invited "eight prominent sculptors to participate." Several of the entrants had already designed U.S. coins and achieved considerable fame. Although the youngest participant and a novice coin designer, de Francisci "won the competition and took home the $1,500 cash prize." Regarding this event, "The Dec. 20, 1920, issue of the Baltimore Sun reported…'Eight medalists, all of them from New York, were in the competition for the award. The designs in bas-relief were exhibited privately in the office of [Mint Director Raymond T. Baker], after he had shown the winning one to President Harding. The President expressed his pleasure and approval.'" Becoming the designer of the Peace Dollar and receiving considerable publicity as a result of this accomplishment greatly boosted the reputation of de Francisci, taking his career to a whole new level.

De Francisci used his wife Mary Teresa as the model for the Liberty head of the Peace Dollar. When asked about its design, de Francisci "told a newspaper columnist that the portrait was not a 'photograph' of Mrs. de Francisci but was a 'composite' face that 'typified something of America'" De Francisci also said about the design of the Peace Dollar "that his goal was to capture the spirit of the country--its intellectual speed, vigor and vitality."

Other works
De Francisci sculpted the commemorative 1920 Maine Centennial half dollar. Also, de Francisci designed the World War II Honorable Service Lapel Button, unofficially known as the "ruptured duck." The button was intended for wear as a lapel pin on civilian clothing to recognize military service. However, the military did not issue the button. Instead, it was available by private purchase.

He modelled the bronze high reliefs of the drum base of the Sesquicentennial flagpole erected in Union Square, New York, in 1924 and dedicated, July 4, 1926, to mark the 150th anniversary of the signing of the Declaration of Independence. The architect for the project was Perry Coke Smith. Starting from the rear, the effects of liberty, rendered as the march of progress in the arts, crafts and sciences of civilization is represented by figures that move towards the Declaration of Independence reproduced on a tablet at front center, while on the right, the effects of tyranny, in which fleeing humanity avidly reach for it.

According to his wife, de Francisci greatly admired Abraham Lincoln and featured the slain president on many of his personal works. He designed a Lincoln medal for the Hall of Fame for Great Americans in New York. In addition, de Francisci designed the inaugural medal for the 1964/1965 New York World's Fair.

Selected works

Later life
De Francisci was buried at Saint Raymond's Cemetery in the Bronx, New York.

Awards
Saltus Award, 1927
Lindsey Morris award, 1932
Widener Gold Medal, 1938

Notes

External links

"Antonio de Francisci - The Veteran's Engraver". Excellent background on Anthony de Francisci.
Artist Anthony de Francisci. Anthony de Francisci featured on Smithsonian American Art Museum website. Includes examples of his work preserved at the Smithsonian Institution.
"The Peace Dollar" (includes a biography)

1887 births
1964 deaths
American currency designers
American medallists
Naturalized citizens of the United States
20th-century American sculptors
American male sculptors
Coin designers
Artists from Palermo
Italian emigrants to the United States
20th-century American male artists